Jun Gyeong Park (born January 22, 1993) is a South Korean-born American soccer player.

Career

Youth and university
Park grew up in Jeongeup, South Korea, and attended Wonsam Middle School. Park was a member of FC Seoul's reserves and academy in the Korean K-League.

Professional

In August 2016 Park signed with the Colorado Springs Switchbacks FC after starting the 2016 season for Real Monarchs.

References

External links
Colorado Springs Switchbacks FC bio

1993 births
Living people
American soccer players
American sportspeople of Korean descent
American people of South Korean descent
FC Seoul players
People from Jeongeup
USL Second Division players
Colorado Springs Switchbacks FC players
USL Championship players
Association football forwards
Sportspeople from North Jeolla Province